Lift up your hearts! is an English hymn written in 1881 by the Anglican academic and clergyman H. Montagu Butler. The words echo the English translation of the Sursum corda, a part of the communion liturgy in Christian churches.

Music
In the Church of England, Lift up your hearts! is usually sung to Woodlands, a musical setting composed by Walter Greatorex for Gresham's School (where he was Director of Music) in 1916. Woodlands is the name of a house at the school.

School song
The hymn became the school song of Walter Greatorex's old school, Derby (a tradition continued by Derby Grammar School), Haileybury and Imperial Service College, Hertford, and also of Poundswick Grammar School, Wythenshawe, Manchester.  It is also the school hymn of Melbourne's Haileybury College, Benenden School, Hilton College, Cranbrook, County Grammar School for Boys, Woking, Surrey and Queen Mary's High School for Girls, Walsall and Mayfield Preparatory School, also part of the Queen Mary's foundation. It was also the school song of Thoresby High School for Girls in the centre of Leeds until this school combined to become co-ed with Central Grammar School for Boys in 1972.  It was also the school hymn for Stoke Damerel High School for Girls in Plymouth (1926 - 1986 closure).  It was also the school hymn for Kingston High School, Kingston upon Hull.

Words

References

External links
Lift up your hearts! at The Ames Collection
Lift up your hearts! at the Cyber Hymnal

Lift Up Your Hearts!
19th-century hymns